Tuzuk-e-Jahangiri or Tuzuk-i-Jahangiri or Jahangir-nama is the autobiography of Mughal Emperor Jahangir (1569–1627). Also referred to as Jahangirnama, the Tuzk-e-Jahangiri is written in Persian, and follows the tradition of his great-grandfather, Babur (1487–1530), who had written the Baburnama; though Jahangir went a step further and besides writing on the history of his reign, he included details such as his reflections on art, politics, and information about his family.

He wrote the memoirs in stages through most of his life until 1622. His own manuscript was magnificently illustrated by his studio of painters, but the illustrations were very early dispersed, many being found in muraqqa (albums) compiled by his sons. Several are in the British Library.he also sufferd from asthma and died in 1627

Overview

The text details the first 19 years of his reign (from 1605–1623), but he gave up the writing of his memoirs in 1621. The complete Tuzuk-e-Jahangiri written by Jahangir himself is housed in the National Museum of India since the 1950's. He then entrusted the task to Mu‘tamad Khān, the author of the Iqbal-nama, who continued the memoirs at the start of 1623. From here, it was taken up by Muhammad Hadi, who continued it to Jahangir's death in 1627. It forms an important reference point with respect to the era of his father Akbar and his official chronicle, the Akbarnama. The first important printed version of Jahangirnama was by Sayyid Ahmad, printed at Ghazipur in 1863 and at Aligarh in 1864.

Jahangir's autobiography reflects his views on various political, religious and social issues. He noted many of his local legislative policies. Among them were his decrees to manage and regulate the jagirdars. These were people who held the jagir, the emperor's land grant title. The jagirdars were to receive the income of the land and use it to mainly finance the maintenance of troops and addressing town needs. Jahangir made various attempts to halt corruption within the jagirdars. He prohibited each of them from using the money for personal profit by ordering that part of the land income to go to hospitals and infirmaries and for each town to be equipped with religious buildings. Jahangir also kept the jagirdars from gaining interest in family or land riches by ordering the jagirdars to seek his approval before marrying someone from the town they ruled in.

See also 
 Babarnama
 Akbarnama
 Tuzk-e-Taimuri

References

Work online
 The Tūzuk-i-Jahangīrī Or Memoirs Of Jahāngīr, Alexander Rogers and Henry Beveridge. Royal Asiatic Society, 1909–1914.

Bibliography 
 
 
 
 
Losty, J. P. Roy, Malini (eds), Mughal India: Art, Culture and Empire, 2013, British Library, 9780712358705

Further reading
Jahangir, Emperor of Hindustan, The Jahangirnama, Memoirs of Jahangir, Emperor of India, trans. and ed. W.M. Thackston, Oxford University Press, New York and Oxford, 1999

Mughal royal books
Persian-language literature
Books about the Mughal Empire
Indian autobiographies
17th-century Indian books
Mughal art
Indian manuscripts
Islamic illuminated manuscripts
17th-century illuminated manuscripts
Indian chronicles